Sydenham Lake is a lake of Ontario, Canada to the east of the town of Sydenham. The lake drains into Lake Ontario through Millhaven Creek to the west.

See also
List of lakes in Ontario

References
 National Resources Canada
 Sydenham Lake

Lakes of Frontenac County